Catherine (or variants) O'Brien may refer to:

 Catherine Amelia O'Brien (1881–1963), Irish stained glass artist
 Catherine O'Brien (film scholar), British film scholar
 Catherine O'Brien (Neighbours)
 Katherine O'Brien, physician and scientist in the field of pneumococcal disease
Katharine O'Brien, film director

See also

Kitty O'Brien (disambiguation)
Cathy O'Brien (disambiguation)
Kate O'Brien (disambiguation)